

Mutatesia Leonelli (died 1662) was a lawyer and later appointed Treasurer Pontifical Chambers by Pope Urban VIII. He was also a poet, publishing three works throughout his lifetime. With the exception of a short period of financial hardship which resulted in a brief excommunication, he led a successful life at the Papal Court. He was the older brother of Innocenzo Leonelli and the Discalced Carmelite missionary Ignatius of Jesus.

Works

References

Citations

Bibliography

1662 deaths
17th-century Italian poets
17th-century Italian lawyers
Officials of the Roman Curia